The 2016–17 STOK Elite Division was the 2nd season of the Cypriot fourth-level football league.

Format
Fourteen teams participated in the 2016–17 STOK Elite Division. All teams played against each other twice, once at their home and once away. The team with the most points at the end of the season crowned champions. The first three teams were promoted to the 2016–17 Cypriot Third Division and the last two teams were relegated to the regional leagues.

Point system
Teams received three points for a win, one point for a draw and zero points for a loss.

Changes from previous season
Teams promoted to 2016–17 Cypriot Third Division
 Livadiakos/Salamina Livadion
 Peyia 2014
 AEN Ayiou Georgiou Vrysoullon-Acheritou

Teams relegated from 2015–16 Cypriot Third Division
 Kouris Erimis 
 Amathus Ayiou Tychona

Teams promoted from regional leagues
 Doxa Paliometochou
 Atlas Aglandjias
 Koloni Geroskipou FC

Teams relegated to regional leagues
 Enosis Kokkinotrimithia
 Adonis Idaliou

Stadia and locations

League standings

Results

Sources

See also
 STOK Elite Division
 2016–17 Cypriot First Division
 2016–17 Cypriot Second Division
 2016–17 Cypriot Third Division
 2016–17 Cypriot Cup for lower divisions

References

STOK Elite Division seasons
Cyprus
2016–17 in Cypriot football